Ptolemy (c. AD 100 – c. 170) was a Greek mathematician, astronomer, geographer and astrologer. 

Ptolemy may also refer to:

 Ptolemy (name), including a list of people with the name
Ptolemy I Soter (303 – 282 BC), Hellenistic ruler of Egypt who established the Ptolemaic dynasty (305 BC – 30 BC)
 Mount Ptolemy (Antarctica)
 Mount Ptolemy (Canada)
 Tolomeo ('Ptolemy'), an opera seria by Handel 
 "Ptolemy", a track by Aphex Twin from the 1992 album Selected Ambient Works 85-92
 PTOLEMY, a Cosmic neutrino background detector under construction

See also

Tolomeo (disambiguation)